The United Kingdom–United States Free Trade Agreement (UKUSFTA) is a proposed free trade agreement between the United Kingdom and the United States. It was under negotiation as of 2020.

The UK became able to independently negotiate trade agreements when it left the European Union on 31 January 2020 (with a transition period until the end of 2020).

History 
The United Kingdom and the United States began negotiations on 5 May 2020, and have had four rounds of negotiations as of September 2020.

In December 2020, the two countries signed an agreement on various goods continuing trading terms from previous United States-European Union agreements.

In 2022, with the administration of President Joe Biden uninterested in further negotiations, the United Kingdom began negotiating economic agreements with individual states. (Regulation of international trade is a federal responsibility under the Commerce Clause of the U.S. Constitution, preventing state agreements from changing customs rules.)

Draft legal and treaty text 
On 28 February 2019, the United States released its negotiating objectives. The United Kingdom released its objectives on 1 March.

Areas covered in the FTA and contention points 
 Trade in Goods
 Sanitary and Phytosanitary Measures (SPS):* Customs and Trade Facilitation* Rules of Origin
 Technical Barriers to Trade (TBT)
 Good Regulatory Practices
 Transparency, Publication, and Administrative Measures
 Trade in Services, Including Telecommunications and Financial Services
 Digital Trade in Goods and Services and Cross-Border Data Flows
 Investment
 Intellectual Property
 Procedural Fairness for Pharmaceuticals and Medical Devices
 State-Owned and Controlled Enterprises (SOEs)
 State Subsidies
 Competition Policy
 Labour (human activity)
 Environment
 Anti-corruption
 Trade Remedies
 Settlement
 General Provisions
 Currency

Documents 
United Kingdom
 Trade Negotiations Objectives 

United States 
 Trade Negotiation Objectives

See also 
 List of bilateral agreements
 List of multilateral agreements
 Trade agreements of the United Kingdom 
 United States free-trade agreements

References 

Free trade agreements of the United Kingdom
Free trade agreements of the United States
Trade